Gordon Scott (born December 26, 1976) is an American professional basketball swingman who played for the VfL Kirchheim Knights from 2008 to 2011.

Career 
Scott played college basketball with the Idaho Vandals men's basketball team and later for the Dakota Wizards. He was not drafted in the 2000 NBA draft and began playing in Germany with the Dragons Rhöndorf. For the next season, he was traded to Riesen Ludwigsburg, where he played two seasons in the Basketball Bundesliga.

References 

African-American basketball players
1976 births
Living people
American men's basketball players
21st-century African-American sportspeople
20th-century African-American sportspeople
Idaho Vandals men's basketball players
Basketball players from Tucson, Arizona
Dakota Wizards players